The Five Emperors may refer to:

 The Five Good Emperors of the Roman Empire who ruled from 96 to 180: Nerva, Trajan, Hadrian, Antoninus Pius and Marcus Aurelius
Year of the Five Emperors, 193 CE
 The Five Emperors and Three Sovereigns, mythical rulers of ancient China
 Wufang Shangdi a set of five Chinese deities called Emperors